Avalanche is an unincorporated community in the town of Webster, Vernon County, Wisconsin, United States. The community took its name from a geographic feature east of the village that looked like an avalanche.

Notes

Unincorporated communities in Vernon County, Wisconsin
Unincorporated communities in Wisconsin